Gleb Yevgeniyevich Kotelnikov (Russian: Глеб Евгеньевич Котельников,  – November 22, 1944), was the Russian-Soviet inventor of the knapsack parachute (first in the hard casing and then in the soft pack), and braking parachute.

Early life
He was born in the family of a professor of mechanics and higher mathematics. Parents were fond of theater, and this hobby influenced their son. From childhood he sang, played the violin, and also liked to make different toys and models.

He graduated from the Kiev Military School in 1894. After three years of compulsory service, he went into the reserve. He served as an excise official in the provinces, helped organize drama circles, sometimes played in plays, and he continued to design. In 1910, Gleb returned to St Petersburg and became an actor in the troupe of the People's House on the Petersburg side (the pseudonym of Glebov-Kotelnikov).

Professional career 
In 1911, he created his first parachute RK-1 (which stands for Rantseviy (knapsack) or Russian Kotelnikova (by Kotelnikov), 1st model), that was successfully employed in 1914 during World War I. Later on, Kotelnikov significantly improved the design of his parachute, creating new models, including RK-2 with a softer knapsack, RK-3, and a few cargo parachutes, all of which would be adopted by the Soviet Air Force.

Having witnessed the death of a talented Russian pilot Lev Matsivich and been shocked by it, he became obsessed with the idea of constructing a parachute, to which he devoted several years of his life as well as all his personal savings. In 1911 he applied for a patent to the Committee on Inventions in France and was granted the patent under the number 438612, in which he summarized the function of his parachute:
The working principle of the apparatus is as follows: 
in case of an emergency, a pilot, wearing it on his back, could throw himself out of an aircraft, opening a knapsack by pulling a cord attached to its lock. In case of an unexpected fall the device can work quite automatically. For that purpose the lock of the parapack is connected with a carriage of an aircraft by means of a cord which would open the lock of a parapack being stretched under the weight of a falling man.
At first G.Kotelnikov called his invention a safety apparatus, a knapsack-parachute and later on it got the name of RK-1.

In 1912, on a road near Tsarskoye Selo (now part of St. Petersburg) Kotelnikov successfully demonstrated the braking effects of the parachute by accelerating a Russo-Balt automobile to the top speed, and then opening a parachute attached to the back seat, thus inventing the drogue parachute. In aviation, however, drag chutes were used for the first time only in 1937 by the Soviet airplanes in the Arctic that were providing support for the famous polar expeditions of the era, such as the first drifting ice station North Pole-1, launched the same year. The drag chute allowed to land safely on the ice-floes of smaller size.

Kotelnikov continued to be an important figure in the development of parachutes and parachuting in the Soviet Union. In 1924 Kotelnikov for the first time applied the soft packing of parachute instead of a hard casing. He produced some of the earliest cargo parachutes, and was a contemporary to the start of the parachuting sport in Russia in 1930 and the creation of the Soviet Airborne Troops the same year (the first paratrooping force in history). In his late years, Kotelnikov wrote a book about the invention and subsequent development of parachutes.

Kotelnikov died November 22, 1944, during World War II. The village Saalisi, where he first tested his parachute was renamed Kotelnikovo in his honor. His grave at Novodevichy Cemetery in Moscow became a place of pilgrimage for Russian paratroopers.

References

External links
 History, at margaret.imec.msu.ru

1872 births
1944 deaths
Burials at Novodevichy Cemetery
Russian inventors
Parachuting
Soviet inventors